Get 'Em Young is a 1926 American short comedy film starring Stan Laurel.

Cast
 Harry Myers as Orvid Joy
 Eugenia Gilbert as The girl
 Stan Laurel as Summers, the butler
 Max Davidson as Isaac Goldberg, a lawyer
 Charlotte Mineau as Hired bride
 Fred Malatesta as Executor
 Ernest Wood as Lawrence Lavendar Virgin, a female impersonator (as Ernie Wood)

Production notes
Oliver Hardy was originally cast as Summers, the butler, in this short film, but had to be replaced before filming by Stan Laurel, who had not acted in films for about a year as he had been working as a writer and director, and with whom he would soon team up with at the Hal Roach Studios. Hardy had been injured in a cooking accident at home where he burned his arm after a frying pan of scalding grease spilled onto it, and was still recovering when filming for Get 'em Young began. This accident forced Hardy to be removed from the cast of the Mabel Normand film Raggedy Rose as well.

Theatre fire incident
This was the film being shown at the 1927 Laurier Palace Theatre Fire in Montreal, Canada, where 78 people died, all but one under age 16.

See also
 List of American films of 1926
 Stan Laurel filmography

References

External links

1926 films
1926 short films
American silent short films
American black-and-white films
1926 comedy films
Films directed by Fred Guiol
Films directed by Stan Laurel
Silent American comedy films
American comedy short films
1920s American films